Matt Hewitt (born 7 July 1991 in Durban, South Africa) is a professional surfer.

He won the New Zealand National Surfing Championships in 2009. Hewitt has been a member of the New Zealand surfing team for the last four years.

References

External links
Surfing NZ profile
Billabong profile

1991 births
Living people
New Zealand surfers